The episodes of Hanasakeru Seishōnen are produced by Studio Pierrot. The series premiered on April 5, 2009 on the NHK, and ended in 2010. It has a total of 39 episodes. The series was directed by Chiaki Kon until episode 20, but changed afterward to Hajime Kamegaki for unknown reasons. Two pieces of theme music are used, one opening theme and one ending theme. The opening theme, "Change", and the ending theme, "One", are both performed by J-Min.

Episode listings

List of Specials

DVD releases
A total of 13 DVD releases are set to be published by Studio Pierrot, each containing three episodes. The first was released in July 2009 and the last will be released in July 2010.

References

External links
Official Studio Pierrot Hanasakeru Seishōnen website 
Official NHK Hanasakeru Seishōnen anime website 

Hanasakeru Seishonen